"Anything" is a song recorded by German Eurodance group Culture Beat, released in December 1993 as the third single from their second album, Serenity (1993). Written by Nosie Katzmann with Jay Supreme, Torsten Fenslau and Peter Zweie, the song was very successful on the charts in Europe. It reached the top 5 in at least nine countries, including Belgium, France, Germany, Spain and the United Kingdom. A music video was produced to promote the song, filmed in London.

Critical reception
Larry Flick from Billboard reviewed the song favorably, stating that the German rave/pop duo "likely will continue to enjoy widespread action with this hooky, NRGetic anthem." He added, "Rapper Jay Supreme raps with fire and speed, while Tania Evans does her best with a chorus that is maddeningly silly. And yet single has ample charm, fueled by a double-pack of remixes that are sure to woo DJs at several formats." John Patrick from Lake District News declared it as "another good one". In his weekly UK chart commentary, James Masterton wrote, "Despite being as formulaic as the last two, the new hit is actually quite good fun, trying at times to make the rapper trip over his own tongue in what is one of the fastest sung dance records ever." Pan-European magazine Music & Media said that "by now everybody knows what it tastes like. But at the moment it's a matter of addiction for the public, and a third European hit from the Serenity album is within reach." 

Alan Jones from Music Week felt the song "is an altogether less compelling record. It's much too frantic, rattling along like any number of rave/hi-NRG tracks, and possesses an uncharismatic rap. Sure to score, but don't expect it to chart particularly high, or hang around for long." In an retrospective review, Pop Rescue complimented it as "superior". James Hamilton from the RM Dance Update described it as a "frantic hip house galloper". Mark Frith from Smash Hits gave it four out of five, writing that Culture Beat has released a "rather good breakneck speed dance record. It's not destined to be as big a chart hit as "Mr Vain" and "Got to Get It", but it'll go Top 20 all the same. It should do masses for their credibility club-wise."

Chart performance
"Anything" was a major hit in many countries, particularly in Austria, Denmark, France and Spain where it reached number three and four, respectively, and in the UK, where the song peaked at number five in its first week at the UK Singles Chart, on January 9, 1994. It spent two weeks at that position, while peaking at number two on the UK Dance Singles Chart. However, it also achieved a great success in the other countries in which it was released, such as Switzerland (7) and the Netherlands (4). "Anything" also entered the top 20 in Finland (12), Italy (15) and Sweden (15). On the Eurochart Hot 100, it debuted at number 22 on 15 January and peaked three weeks later at four. And it topped the European Dance Radio Chart. Outside Europe, the song charted at number three in Israel, number six on the RPM Dance/Urban chart in Canada, number seven on the Billboard Hot Dance Club Play chart in the US and number 12 in Australia. 

"Anything" was awarded with a gold record in Australia and Germany, after 35,000 and 250,000 singles were sold.

Airplay
"Anything" entered the European airplay chart Border Breakers at number 20 on 8 January 1994 due to crossover airplay in West Central- and South-European regions and peaked at number four on 22 January.

Music video
The accompanying music video for "Anything" was directed by Swedish-based director Matt Broadley. It was filmed in London and received heavy rotation on MTV Europe in February 1994.

Track listings

 CD maxi-single (Europe, 1993)
 "Anything" (Grosser Club Mix) – 7:34
 "Anything" (Introless) – 6:11
 "Anything" (Tribal House Mix) – 6:29
 "Anything" (Radio Converted) – 3:56
 "Anything" (MTV Mix) – 4:35

 CD maxi-single – Remix (Europe, 1994)
 "Anything" (Trancemix) – 6:29 (Remix by Doug Laurent)
 "Anything" (Not Normal Mix) – 6:06 (Remix by Peter Gräber)
 "Anything" (T'N'T Partyzone Chicken Beat Mix) – 5:26 (Remix by Tillmann, Tielmann)
 "Anything" (Tribal) – 6:09 (Remix by Doug Laurent)

 Vinyl 12" (USA, 1994)
 "Anything" (Album Version) – 6:24
 "Anything" (Ralphi's Club Mix W/O Rap) – 7:03 (Remix by Ralphi Rosario)
 "Anything" (TNT Party Zone Mix) – 5:26 (Remix by Tillmann, Tielmann)
 "Anything" (Ralphi's Anything You Want Mix) – 6:00 (Remix by Ralphi Rosario)
 "Anything" (Introless Mix) – 6:11
 "Anything" (SSL Main Mix) – 6:35

 CD maxi-single (USA, 1994)
 "Anything" (Radio Converted Mix) – 3:56
 "Anything" (Ralphi's Radio Remix) – 3:40 (Remix by Ralphi Rosario)
 "Anything" (Grosser Club Mix) – 7:34
 "Anything" (TNT Party Zone Mix) – 5:26 (Remix by Tillmann, Tielmann)
 "Anything" (Ralphi's Anything You Want Mix) – 6:00 (Remix by Ralphi Rosario)
 "Culture Beat DMC Megamix" – 6:33

Charts and certifications

Weekly charts

Year-end charts

Certifications

References

1993 singles
1993 songs
Culture Beat songs
Dance Pool singles
English-language German songs
Music videos directed by Matt Broadley
Songs written by Jay Supreme
Songs written by Nosie Katzmann
Songs written by Torsten Fenslau